Rochdale is a town in the Metropolitan Borough of Rochdale, Greater Manchester, England, and it is unparished.  The town and the surrounding countryside contain 139 listed buildings that are recorded in the National Heritage List for England.  Of these, four are listed at Grade I, the highest of the three grades, four are at Grade II*, the middle grade, and the others are at Grade II, the lowest grade.

Until the coming of the Industrial Revolution the area was largely rural and agricultural, and some of the agricultural buildings were grouped into settlements known as folds.  Most of the earlier listed buildings are houses and associated structures, farmhouses and farm buildings.  Industry came in the form of textiles, both wool and cotton, and it was initially carried out in domestic premises, and many of the listed buildings of this time are houses, often with three storeys and rows of multi-light mullioned weavers' workshop windows in the upper floors.  The Rochdale Canal passes through the town, and some of the bridges and locks associated with it are listed.  The Co-operative movement originated in the town, and its first shop, now a museum, is listed.  The other listed buildings include churches and items in churchyards, public houses, banks, a market cross, textile mills, the entrance to the cemetery, a school, public buildings, statues, bridges, and war memorials.


Key

Buildings

Notes and references

Notes

Citations

Sources

Lists of listed buildings in Greater Manchester
Listed